Sofía Ignacia Hartard Ojeda (born March 6, 1996) is a Chilean footballer who plays as a midfielder in Santiago Morning and Chile women's national team.

Club career 
Hartard played for Universidad de Chile from 2014 to 2017. As the team captain, she won the Apertura 2016 champion of Chile's Primera División with the club.

Hartard signed with Spanish club Sporting Club de Huelva in 2017. She made 30 appearances for the club in the 2017-2018 season.

From 2018 to 2020 Hartard played for Spanish club Deportivo Alavés Gloriosas.

In 2021, she returned to Universidad de Chile.

International career 
Hartard made her senior debut for Chile in a friendly against Brazil on November 25, 2017.

Personal life 
Sofía Hartard is the sister of Chilean footballer Elías Hartard.

References 

1996 births
Living people
Universidad de Chile footballers
Chile women's international footballers
Chilean women's footballers
Chilean expatriate women's footballers
Chilean expatriate sportspeople in Spain
Expatriate women's footballers in Spain
Women's association football midfielders